Beaver Towers is a children's fantasy novel by British author Nigel Hinton which was first published in 1980. It was his first novel written for children and is the first installment in the Beaver Towers series. It follows the story of Philip, a schoolboy dragged off by his kite to an island ruled by intelligent talking animals under threat from a wicked witch and her servants.

Concept
The author wanted to write a story sending a young boy to an island with the kind of dangers, magic and excitement not expected to be found in reality, and someone mentioned kites.

The series
The books in the series are:
Beaver Towers (1980)
The Witch's Revenge (1981)
The Dangerous Journey (1986); also published as Run to Beaver Towers
The Dark Dream (1997)

References

1980 British novels
1980 children's books
Beaver Towers Series
British children's novels
British fantasy novels
Children's fantasy novels
Children's novels about animals
Talking animals in fiction
Witchcraft in written fiction
British fantasy novel series
British children's books
Abelard-Schuman books